The Future Is Now is the only studio album by the American hip hop group Non Phixion. It was released on March 26, 2002, via Uncle Howie/Landspeed Records. Recording sessions took place at Fast Forward Studios, D&D Studios, No Mystery Studios, Battery Studios, Area 51, Chung King House Of Metal in New York, and at the Music Grinder in Los Angeles. Production was handled by Necro, Large Professor, Dave 1, DJ Premier, JuJu, Pete Rock and T-Ray. It features guest appearances from Christian Olde Wolbers, MF Doom, Necro, Marley Metal, Moonshine, Raymond Herrera, Stephen Carpenter and The Beatnuts. The album's cover art was created by Mear One, and the logo is a tribute to Canadian metal band Voivod.

The album was a minor underground hit, peaking at No. 65 on the Billboard Top R&B/Hip-Hop Albums chart and No. 14 on both the Independent Albums and the Heatseekers Albums charts in the United States. The album includes the singles "Black Helicopters", "Drug Music" backed with "If You Got Love", and "Rock Stars" backed with "The C.I.A. Is Trying to Kill Me". "Black Helicopters" was the only charting single from the album, peaking at No. 46 on the Hot Rap Singles chart. A double disc Platinum Edition of the album was released in 2004, with the second disc featuring instrumental versions.

Track listing

Chart positions

Album

Singles

References

External links

2002 debut albums
Non Phixion albums
Albums produced by Pete Rock
Albums produced by Large Professor
Albums produced by the Beatnuts
Albums produced by DJ Premier